Alexandre Yuryevich Bazhenov (Russian: Александр Юрьевич Баженов; born 26 April 1981 in Komsomolsk) is a former Russian racing cyclist.

Palmares

2003
 National Road Race Champion
1st Trofeo Banca Popolare di Vicenza
1st Giro del Belvedere
1st Triptyque des Barrages
1st Stage 3
2nd Gran Premio Palio del Recioto
2nd Trofeo Alcide Degasperi
2008
2nd National Road Race Championships

References

1981 births
Living people
Russian male cyclists
People from Komsomolsk-on-Amur
Sportspeople from Khabarovsk Krai